Magnus Westman (born 9 August 1966) is a Swedish ski jumper. He competed at the 1992 Winter Olympics and the 1994 Winter Olympics. His daughter Frida competed in ski jumping at the 2022 Winter Olympics.

References

External links
 

1966 births
Living people
Swedish male ski jumpers
Olympic ski jumpers of Sweden
Ski jumpers at the 1992 Winter Olympics
Ski jumpers at the 1994 Winter Olympics
People from Örnsköldsvik Municipality
Sportspeople from Västernorrland County